The 2002 IPSC Handgun World Shoot XIII held in Pietersburg, South Africa was the 13th IPSC Handgun World Shoot.

Champions

Open 
The Open division had the largest participation with 339 competitors (43.4 %).

Individual

Teams

Modified 
The Modified division had 55 competitors (7.0 %).

Individual

Teams

Standard 
The Standard division had the second largest participation with 306 competitors (39.2 %).

Individual

Teams

Production 
The Production division had 56 competitors (7.2 %).

Individual

Teams

Revolver 
The Revolver division had 25 competitors (3.2 %).

Individual

Teams

See also 
IPSC Rifle World Shoots
IPSC Shotgun World Shoot
IPSC Action Air World Shoot

References

Match Results - 2002 Handgun World Shoot, South Africa

2002
2002 in shooting sports
Shooting competitions in South Africa
2002 in South African sport
International sports competitions hosted by South Africa